Hesperoyucca newberryi, commonly known as the Grand Canyon Quixote plant or Newberry's yucca, is a plant species endemic to Arizona. It is found only in Mohave and Coconino Counties, on the walls of canyons near the Colorado River.

Hesperoyucca newberryi is a perennial forming a rosette. It is semelparous (flowering once then dying).

References

Agavoideae
Flora of Arizona
Endemic flora of the United States
Flora of the Colorado Plateau and Canyonlands region
Natural history of the Grand Canyon
Plants described in 1947
Flora without expected TNC conservation status